Lafarrell Deshun Bunting (born October 1, 1980 in Memphis, TN) is an American boxer.

Professional career
Known as "Fabulous Fairway", Bunting began his professional career in 2001, and fought in the ShoBox Super Middleweight eliminator tournament, but lost to Anthony Hanshaw via TKO.  In 2007 he lost a decision to contender Jean Pascal.

The Contender
He was one of the featured boxers on the 3rd season of the boxing reality TV series, The Contender, The Contender (season 3), which premiered September 4, 2007 on ESPN.

External links
 

1980 births
Boxers from Tennessee
Living people
Sportspeople from Memphis, Tennessee
Super-middleweight boxers
American male boxers
African-American boxers
21st-century African-American sportspeople
20th-century African-American people